The 1965 Intercontinental Cup was an association football tie held over two legs in September 1965 between the winners of the 1964–65 European Cup Inter Milan and Independiente, winners of the 1965 Copa Libertadores, premier competitions in European and South American club football. This was a rematch of the previous year's edition.

The first leg was held on 8 September 1965 at San Siro, home of Inter, who won the match 3–0, with goals from Joaquín Peiró and Sandro Mazzola. La Doble Visera hosted the return leg 7 days later on 15 September 1965, and ended in a goalless draw. Inter thus won the Intercontinental Cup for the second year in a row.

Qualified teams

Venues

Match details

First leg

Second leg

See also
1964–65 European Cup
1965 Copa Libertadores
Inter Milan in European football

References

External links
1965 Intercontinental Cup at FIFA.com
1965 Intercontinental Cup at Rec.Sport.Soccer Statistics Foundation

 

1965–66 in European football
1965–66 in Italian football
1965 in South American football
1965 in Argentine football
1965
Intercontinental Cup 1965
Intercontinental Cup 1965
International club association football competitions hosted by Italy
International club association football competitions hosted by Argentina
September 1965 sports events in South America
Sports competitions in Milan
1960s in Milan
September 1965 sports events in Europe
Football in Avellaneda